"Fall Back Down" is a song by the American punk rock band Rancid. It was released as the first single from their sixth album, Indestructible. "Fall Back Down" was released to radio on July 22, 2003. It peaked at number 13 on the US Modern Rock Tracks.

"Fall Back Down" was written by Tim Armstrong and Lars Frederiksen after Armstrong's divorce from Distillers vocalist Brody Dalle, and is about friendship. The video featured guest appearances from Benji Madden of Good Charlotte and Kelly Osbourne.

The song features three guitar solos, two by Tim Armstrong and one by Lars Frederiksen.

Canadian musician Lights recorded a cover for her EP titled "Acoustic" in 2010.

Track listing

Charts

References

2003 singles
Rancid (band) songs
Songs written by Tim Armstrong
Songs written by Lars Frederiksen
2003 songs